Martin Kane may refer to:

 Martin Kane, ring name for Andrew Martin, professional wrestler
 Martin Kane, Private Eye, a radio and television drama